The Montserrat Workers' Progressive Party (MWPP) was a political party in Montserrat, led by John Osborne.

History
The party contested the 1966 elections, nominating five candidates for the seven seats. It won one seat, taken by Osborne in the North-Western constituency. By the 1970 elections Osborne was a member of the Progressive Democratic Party.

References

Defunct political parties in Montserrat